Rondeletia pallida is a species of plant in the family Rubiaceae. It is endemic to Jamaica.  It is threatened by habitat loss.

References

Sources
 

Flora of Jamaica
pallida
Vulnerable plants
Endemic flora of Jamaica
Taxonomy articles created by Polbot